Ave Maria, Florida, United States, is a planned community and Census-designated place  in Collier County, Florida.

History
Ave Maria, Florida was founded in 2005 by the Ave Maria Development Company, a partnership consisting of the Barron Collier Companies and the Ave Maria Foundation led by Roman Catholic philanthropist Tom Monaghan, founder of Domino's Pizza and leader of Ave Maria University. Monaghan served as chancellor of Ave Maria University until February 2011. The development of the town was made possible when the Florida legislature created the Ave Maria Stewardship Community District, a limited local government whose purpose is to provide community infrastructure. In 2015-16, it was ranked the 40th top-selling master planned community in the United States, out of 230 such communities tracked.
It earned the "Community of the Year" for seven consecutive years (2015-2021).
In 2020 it broke its previous record for new home sales - selling 507 new homes during the year and ranking 38th on the list of Top Master Planned Communities in the USA.
In January 2021, 77 new homes were sold in Ave Maria - an all-time monthly sales record for the town.

Commerce
Ave Maria is home to various institutions and businesses. Local news is covered by a monthly print magazine, Ave Maria Neighbors, which shares stories of local families, a calendar of events, and topics of human interest in the community.

Ave Maria Oratory 

The town was planned with the large Ave Maria church in the center, the façade of which displays sculptor Márton Váró's  sculpture of the Annunciation, depicting the Archangel Gabriel greeting the Virgin Mary with the words "Ave Maria" (Hail Mary).
 Váró's "Good Shepherd" sculpture is also featured inside the Oratory, also carved in marble from Cave Michelangelo in Carrara, Italy.

The building serves as the home of the Ave Maria Catholic Church, part of the Diocese of Venice, which serves as the parish for local residents and students. One of the oratory's most distinctive characteristics is its steel structure, much of which is exposed internally and externally. The landmark church received an award from the American Institute of Steel Construction in 2008.

Ecology
Ave Maria's location in southern Florida shares the same subtropical wetland ecosystem as the Florida Everglades. It is home to a biodiversity of birds such as wood storks, Anhinga, heron and hawks. The region was sprayed more than 30 times via airplane with pesticides by the Collier Mosquito Control District in 2015 with organophosphates and pyrethroids, making it the most sprayed area in Southwest Florida.  The Collier Mosquito Control District spokesman stated in 2012 to the Ave Maria Herald, "The chemical used in the spraying is Naled, an organophosphate that the EPA has determined to be extremely safe". EPA's 2006 re-registration document for Naled requires a 48-hour re-entry interval for farm workers as "Naled can cause cholinesterase inhibition in humans".

References

External links

Census-designated places in Florida
Planned communities in Florida
Populated places established in 2007
Populated places in Collier County, Florida
2007 establishments in Florida
Christian communities